St Mary's Higher Secondary School, Madurai is a private Catholic secondary school for boys located in Madurai, Tamil Nadu, India. The school was founded by the Society of Jesus in 1908 and provides an education for boys from grades six through twelve.

History

Fr. Trincal started a Gurukula in 1863 and planted the seeds of educational mission in Madurai city especially for the Catholic children. After 16 years, it was transformed into a government-recognized primary school in 1879. In 1908 it was upgraded as a high school. During the tenure of Fr. Santhappar, its first headmaster, the state government of Tamil Nadu gave the school permanent recognition in 1908. In 1978 the high school was upgraded to the status of a higher secondary school. At present there are nearly 132 teaching and non-teaching staff and 3,757 students in the school.

See also

 List of Jesuit schools
 List of schools in Tamil Nadu

References  

Jesuit secondary schools in India
Boys' schools in India
Christian schools in Tamil Nadu
High schools and secondary schools in Tamil Nadu
Schools in Madurai
Educational institutions established in 1908
1908 establishments in India